Vincentius Sensi Potokota (born 11 July 1951) is an Indonesian Roman Catholic archbishop.

Biography
Born in Ende Regency, Potokota was ordained as priest in the Archdiocese of Ende on 11 May 1980.

On 14 December 2005 Potokota was appointed as the bishop of the newly established Diocese of Maumere. The episcopal ordination took place on 23 April 2006, with the Archbishop of Jakarta, Cardinal Julius Darmaatmadja S.J. ordaining Potokota as bishop. The co-consecratos of the event were then-bishop of Weetebula Gerulfus Kherubim Pareira S.V.D., and then-bishop of Pangkal Pinang Hilarius Moa Nurak S.V.D.

Little more than a year after being ordained bishop of Maumere, Potokota was installed as archbishop of the Archdioceses of Ende after the death of Longinus Da Cunha. Potokota was installed as archbishop on 7 June 2007.

As archbishop of the diocese, Potokota has campaigned on several issues in East Nusa Tenggara, such as discouraging mining and deforestation in the province because of the damage it causes to the environment.

References 

1951 births
Living people
People from East Nusa Tenggara
21st-century Roman Catholic archbishops in Indonesia